Senegal competed at the 2014 Summer Youth Olympics, in Nanjing, China from 16 August to 28 August 2014.

Athletics

Senegal qualified one athlete.

Qualification Legend: Q=Final A (medal); qB=Final B (non-medal); qC=Final C (non-medal); qD=Final D (non-medal); qE=Final E (non-medal)

Boys
Field Events

Canoeing

Senegal qualified one boat based on its performance at the 2013 World Junior Canoe Sprint and Slalom Championships.

Boys

Equestrian

Senegal qualified a rider.

Fencing

Senegal was given a quota to compete by the tripartite committee.

Girls

Judo

Senegal was given a quota to compete by the tripartite committee.

Individual

Team

Taekwondo

Senegal was given a wild card to compete.

Girls

References

2014 in Senegalese sport
Nations at the 2014 Summer Youth Olympics
Senegal at the Youth Olympics